Vladimir Mikhaylovich Samozhenkov (born 1950) is the Prime Minister of the Republic of Adygea, Russia. He was appointed by Aslan Tkhakushinov on January 15, 2007, succeeding Kazbek Paranuk at the post. He was confirmed by the State Council two days later.

References

1950 births
Living people
Russian politicians
Politics of the Republic of Adygea
People from Adygea
Date of birth missing (living people)